Northern Valley Regional High School may refer to one of the following high schools of Northern Valley Regional High School District in Bergen County, New Jersey:
Northern Valley Regional High School at Demarest
Northern Valley Regional High School at Old Tappan